Jizzakh Region (Жиззах вилояти, جٮززﻩخ ۋٮلايەتى) is one of the regions of Uzbekistan. It is located in the center/east of the country. It borders with Tajikistan to the south and south-east, Samarqand Region to the west, Navoiy Region to the north-west, Kazakhstan to the north, and Sirdaryo Region to the east. It covers an area of 21,210 km2. The population is 1,443,408 (2022 estimate) with 53% living in rural areas.

The regional capital is Jizzakh (pop. 179,200, 2020). Other major towns include Doʻstlik, Gagarin, Gʻallaorol, Paxtakor, and Dashtobod. Jizzakh Region was formerly a part of Sirdaryo Region but was given separate status in 1973.

Economy

The economy of Jizzakh Region is primarily based on agriculture. Cotton and wheat are the main crops, and extensive irrigation is used. Natural resources include lead, zinc, iron, and limestone. Uzbekistan and China are working together to jointly establish a Special Economic Zone in the region. This high-tech industrial park will be formally established by March 2013. The China Development Bank will provide a $50 million loan to finance several of the joint projects in the construction, agro-industrial and mechanical engineering sectors.

The region has a well-developed transportation infrastructure, with over 2500 km of surfaced roads.

Geography

The climate is a typically continental climate, with mild winters and hot, dry summers.

The Zaamin National Park, formerly Guralash Reserve, on the western slopes of the Turkestan Range and known for its unique fauna and flora, is also within the region.

Wildlife is extremely rich here; in spring and in summer, alpine meadows are with a multitude of colors: bright-red tulips and snow-white acacias. In autumn the hills are magnificently decorated with the gold-colored domes of the hazelnut trees, columns of birch-trees, towering plane trees, and green thickets. High in the mountains, in the upper part of the Guralashsoy gorge, is a nesting-place of black storks. These rare birds are the pride and joy of Uzbekistan. They are written down in the "Redbooks" in many countries as an endangered species. Early in the spring when the Arnasoy depression is flooded, flocks of ducks, wild geese, pelicans and grey herons are found here. This territory serves as a nesting place for rose-coloured starlings, shrikes, and sandpipers.

Districts

The Jizzakh Region consists of 12 districts (listed below) and one district-level city: Jizzakh.

There are 6 cities (Jizzakh, Gʻallaorol, Doʻstlik, Dashtobod, Gagarin, Paxtakor) and 42 urban-type settlements in the Jizzakh Region.

Demographics

Permanent population 
The permanent population of Jizzakh region was 1,352,100 at the January 1, 2019, grew by 27,100 people or increased by 2.0%. Urbanisation was 46,9% (634,300 cities population and 53,1% or 717,800 rural population) in the beginning of 2019.

Analysis by district shows that the largest population was in Sh. Rashidov district  213.9 thousand people, (region) share in the population (15.8%) and in Jizzakh city - 174.6 thousand people
(12.9%), while the smallest population is Arnasay with 45.2 thousand people (3.3%) and Yangiabad
27.6 thousand people (2.0%) in the district on January 1, 2019.

By district, the highest population growth rate is for the corresponding period of 2017 15.8% in Sh. Rashidov district and Jizzakh city 12.9%, in Gʻallaorol district 12.4%, Zaamin 11.8% in Arnasay district and 3.3% in Yangiabad district. 2.0%.

Migration 
Immigrated people across the region in January–December 2018 the number was 11.1 thousand and the number of emigrants was 12.1 thousand. The migration balance was minus 0.8 thousand people, compared to less 0,8 thousand people in 2017. The higher the migration balance level was in (minus 0.5 thousand person) Pakhtakor (minus 0.4 thousand person), in the city of Jizzakh (minus 0.3 thousand people),

References

External links
Jizzakh Region official web site.

 
Regions of Uzbekistan